The News Journal is the main newspaper for Wilmington, Delaware, and the surrounding area.  It is headquartered in unincorporated New Castle County, Delaware, near New Castle, and is owned by Gannett.

History
The ancestry of the News Journal reflects the mergers of several newspapers. It is dated to Oct. 1, 1866 when Howard M. Jenkins and Wilmer Atkinson started the afternoon publication Daily Commercial. In 1877, that paper was absorbed into a rival, the Every Evening, founded by Georgetown native William T. Croasdale.

The Evening Journal, later owned by the Du Pont family, was founded in 1888 as a competitor to the Every Evening. The two papers merged in 1933.

Another predecessor to the News Journal was the Morning Herald, founded in 1876 by Philadelphia lawyer John O'Byrne. It later became the Daily Morning News, bought by Alfred I. Du Pont in 1911.

For most of the 20th century, the Du Pont family owned these two Delaware newspapers, The Morning News and The Evening Journal. Ownership of both papers was consolidated in 1919 when feuding factions of the family reconciled, forming the News Journal Company.

DuPont decided to sell The News Journal Company in 1978.  Gannett won the bidding war, beating the Hearst Corporation and The Washington Post Company. Gannett paid $60 million for the two Delaware papers and merged them in 1989 to form one paper, The News Journal.

In 2010, The News Journal Company became The News Journal Media Group in an effort to collectively identify their extensive product portfolio of print, digital, video and new media.

Most recent circulation statements show The News Journal daily circulation at 26,550 (Issue Date: August 21, 2019) and Sunday circulation at 39,375 (Issue Date: August 25, 2019).

Coverage area
The News Journal covers New Castle County most in-depth,  but also offers considerable coverage of the Delaware General Assembly and the Delaware beaches.  The paper also offers limited coverage of northeast Maryland and southeast Pennsylvania, mostly by means of short news briefs.  The paper publishes national and international articles from wire services.

Sections
Regular sections
News
Local & BusinessSportsLifeClassifiedsSpecial sectionsInnovate Delaware Health (Tuesdays)Crossroads (Thursdays) – contains news about schools and other local, human-interest features. High schools in Delaware each have pick a student to write a short report about the happenings at their school for Crossroads.  In April 2007, The News Journal began reprinting articles from local high school newspapers in the Crossroads section.55 Hours (Fridays) – movie reviews, food reviews, and info about events occurring in the 55 hours of the weekend (and beyond)Auto (Saturdays)Sunday Life'Website and video
The News Journal Media Group entered the Internet age in the late 1990s with the launch of Delaware Online, a website with an online edition of all local content in the paper, as well as job listings and classified ads. The paper began offering an online news update weekdays at 4:30 pm. The once-daily update has evolved into as-it-happens online news coverage that often results in a couple dozen news updates per day.

DelawareOnline.com was the first newspaper in the country to offer a morning and afternoon online newscast, with anchor Patty Petite.

DelawareOnline.com was cited in a 2008 Wilkerson and Associates study as the site Delawareans visit first for news and entertainment.  More than one million unique visitors are recorded each month. As of July 2020, the Delaware Online Facebook page had more than 200,000 followers.

Community involvementThe News Journal participates in the Newspapers for Education program, which provides free newspapers for area schools. On Fridays during the school year, the paper publishes an informational feature for school children, in the form of colorful, pull-out, double-truck page in the Life section.

In 2006, The News Journal provided Glasgow High School a $10,000 grant to help the school's newspaper, The Dragon Fire. The News Journal also sent editors to Glasgow to help the Dragon Fire with page layout and web design.

The News Journal Company also runs the Needy Family Fund, which partners with local charities to assist family in need of food and clothing.  Each Christmas season, The News Journal asks readers to donate to the fund, and publishes a list of those who do.

The News Journal Media Group has partnered with nearly half of the registered not-for-profit companies (registered 501(c)3) in New Castle County.  A customized link – offering all types of correspondence from not-for-profits, church leaders and community affairs personnel – is available at the bottom of DelawareOnline.com.  In addition, The News Journal publishes a dedicated not-for-profit customized publication, GET INVOLVED, which is distributed in the paper every other month.

 Notable reporters 
 Rod Beaton – sports journalist 
 Al Cartwright – Cartwright wrote sports columns for The News Journal and its predecessors from 1947 to 1968, and 1971–1983.
 Bill Fleischman (1966 to 1969)
 Izzy Katzman – Katzman was a sports editor from 1950 to 1986.
 Norman Lockman – Lockman served as managing editor of The News Journal from 1984 to 1991.  After that, he became a member of the editorial board and wrote a regular column in the paper.  Before joining The News Journal, Lockman won a Pulitzer Prize for a series of articles on race relations he co-wrote for The Boston Globe''. Suffering from Lou Gehrig's disease, Lockman wrote his final column in late 2004.  He died the following April.
 Matt Zabitka – Zabitka served as a sports editor from 1962 to 2002.

References

External links

 
 

Newspapers published in Delaware
Wilmington, Delaware
Gannett publications
Newspapers established in 1866
Companies based in New Castle County, Delaware
1866 establishments in Delaware